The 2010 edition of the Canadian Polaris Music Prize was presented on September 20, 2010. The gala presentation was held at Toronto's Masonic Temple, and was hosted by Grant Lawrence of CBC Radio 3 and Sarah Taylor of MuchMusic.

The winning album, Karkwa's Les Chemins de verre, was the first French language album to win the award.

Jury
The grand jury for the 2010 award included Rob Bowman (York University), Jenny Charlesworth (The Georgia Straight), Leah Collins (Dose.ca), Del Cowie (Exclaim!), Jonathan Dekel (Spinner.ca), Amanda Farrell (Monday Magazine), Jian Ghomeshi (CBC Radio), Marc Xavier Leblanc (freelance journalist and DJ), François Marchand (Vancouver Sun), André Peloquin (BangBang) and Philippe Rezzonico (Rue Frontenac).

Shortlist
The prize's 10-album shortlist was announced on July 6.
 Karkwa, Les Chemins de verre
The Besnard Lakes, The Besnard Lakes Are the Roaring Night
Broken Social Scene, Forgiveness Rock Record
Caribou, Swim
Dan Mangan, Nice, Nice, Very Nice
Owen Pallett, Heartland
Radio Radio, Belmundo Regal
The Sadies, Darker Circles
Shad, TSOL
Tegan and Sara, Sainthood

Longlist
The prize's preliminary 40-album longlist was announced on June 17.

References

External links
 Polaris Music Prize

2010 in Canadian music
2010 music awards
2010